FC Dinamo Almaty (Dınamo fýtbol klýby)  are a Kazakhstani football based in Almaty, Kazakhstan. The club played in the Kazakhstan Super League in season 1993.

Name history
1937 : Founded as Dinamo Almaty based in Almaty
1992 : Reactivated as Dinamo Almaty

References

External links
Club website 

Dinamo Almaty, FC
1937 establishments in the Kazakh Soviet Socialist Republic
Dinamo Almaty, FC
Police association football clubs